Howard Kemneth Brown (January 26, 1922 – April 4, 1975) was a guard in the National Football League. He played three seasons with the Detroit Lions.

References

Players of American football from Dayton, Ohio
Detroit Lions players
American football offensive guards
Indiana Hoosiers football players
1922 births
1975 deaths